The Oberoi Udaivilas is a luxury hotel located in Udaipur, Rajasthan, India. It was rated as the world's best hotel in 2015 by Travel + Leisure.

The hotel was constructed on the hunting grounds of the Maharana of Mewar, which was around 200 years old. Around 40 percent of the total hotel area are designated a wildlife sanctuary.

Description 
There are 87 rooms including a Kohinoor suite and 4 other luxury suites in Udaivilas.

Weddings 
Oberoi Udaivilas is a popular venue for luxurious destination weddings. It costs around 3.5 crore Indian rupees to book the entire hotel for a 2-day wedding.

References

The Oberoi Group
Hotels in Rajasthan
Udaipur
Companies with year of establishment missing